Mark Furze (born 7 May 1986) is an Australian actor and musician.

Career
Furze starred in several productions by the Orange Theatre Company, playing the lead role in a version of Oliver! aged 10. His first TV appearance was in the children's television program Outriders, followed by a role in the film Balmain Boys. At the age of 14 Furze was cast in Water Rats. He appeared also in the movie Jessica as the son of the main character.

Furze was cast to play Ric Dalby in Home and Away from September 2004 until he left on 24 July 2008. He took part in It Takes Two, a celebrity singing challenge, partnered with Rachael Beck. The pair came third overall. Furze appeared as a contestant on the 2007 UK TV show Soapstar Superstar, filmed in Manchester, England, finishing third in the competition behind Emmerdale's Hayley Tamaddon and Coronation Street's Antony Cotton. He was listed in Cleo magazine's annual Most Eligible Bachelors list in 2006.

He played the lead role in the short film "Count Me In", written and directed by Johnny Barker and Jared Kahi. Produced by Lense Flare productions as part of the Coca-Cola beach base activation in Summer 2008–2009, this interactive short film was shot on location at beaches around New Zealand and stars Furze as 'Cam'.

Furze portrayed "Trent" in the television series Underbelly: The Golden Mile in 2010. He also played the role of Damian in the Australian feature film A Heartbeat Away, and played the role of "Dodd" in the US thriller Strays.

Furze has also played in rock bands, forming the band Falcon Road, and joining New Zealand-based Shotgun Alley in February 2011, who released three albums. He was also seen in the video clip of Guy Sebastian's single "Elevator Love" in 2006, playing Bass guitar.

Personal life
Furze is married to Laural Barrett, 2007 winner of Miss New Zealand,  they  met while on the set of  New Zealand rock group ShotgunAlley music video for Eventually in 2011

Filmography

References

External links

Australian male television actors
1986 births
Living people
People from Orange, New South Wales